Neurothemis oligoneura is a species of dragonfly of the family Libellulidae, 
known as the spotted grasshawk. 
It is a medium-sized dragonfly with extensive darkening near the base of the wings found in northern Australia
and New Guinea.

Gallery

See also
 List of Odonata species of Australia

References

Libellulidae
Odonata of Australia
Insects of New Guinea
Taxa named by Friedrich Moritz Brauer
Insects described in 1867